Darren Browne (born 10 October 1996) is an Irish hurler who plays for Cork Senior Championship club Kanturk and at inter-county level with the Cork senior hurling team. He usually lines out as a left wing-back.

Playing career

Kanturk

Browne joined the Kanturk club at a young age and played in all grades of hurling and Gaelic football at juvenile and underage levels before joining the club's top adult teams as a dual player.

On 7 October 2017, Browne was at centre-back when Kanturk defeated Mallow by 0-17 to 1-12 to win the Premier Intermediate Championship title. Kanturk completed the double on 29 October, with Browne lining out at full-back in the 0-14 to 0-13 defeat of Mitchelstown to win the Intermediate Football Championship. He scored a point from left corner-back when Kanturk defeated Kilmaley by 1-23 to 0-25 to win the Munster Championship. Browne won an All-Ireland Championship medal from centre-back on 4 February 2018, after Kanturk's 1-18 to 1-17 defeat of St Patrick's Ballyragget in the final at Croke Park.

Cork

Minor and under-21

Browne first played for Cork as a member of the minor team on 9 April 2014. He was at left wing-back for Cork's 5-26 to 0-09 defeat of Kerry in the Munster Championship.

On 17 June 2015, Browne made his first appearance for the Cork under-21 team in a 1-21 to 1-11 defeat by Waterford in the Munster Championship.

Browne was appointed captain of the Cork under-21 hurling team for the 2017 Munster Championship. On 26 July, he captained the team to a 0-16 to 0-11 Munster Championship final defeat by Clare. Browne was later nominated for a position on the Team of the Year.

Senior

Browne made his first appearance for the Cork senior hurling team on 10 January 2016 when he came on as a substitute in Cork's 1-20 to 0-18 defeat of Kerry in the Munster League. He was later cut from the panel before the National Hurling League.

Career statistics

Club

Division

Inter-county

Honours

Kanturk
Cork Senior A Hurling Championship (1): 2021 (c)
All-Ireland Intermediate Club Hurling Championship (1): 2018
Munster Intermediate Club Hurling Championship (1): 2018
Cork Premier Intermediate Hurling Championship (1): 2017
Cork Intermediate Football Championship (1): 2017

References

External links
Darren Browne profile at the Cork GAA website

1996 births
Living people
Kanturk hurlers
Kanturk Gaelic footballers
Duhallow hurlers
Cork inter-county hurlers